Khat railway station serves Khat and surrounding villages in Nagpur District of Maharashtra, India.

References

Railway stations in Nagpur district
Nagpur SEC railway division